Date Night: Chromeo Live! is the first live album by Canadian electro-funk duo Chromeo, released on June 25, 2021, by Last Gang Records (LP) and eOne (digital download). The album was recorded during the group's 2019 US tour. The album was born while the group was listening to tour recordings out of a feeling of nostalgia during the COVID-19 pandemic. Proceeds from the album's sales benefit the Touring Professionals Alliance, which helps members of the live music industry impacted by the pandemic. The group released ‘Don’t Sleep (Live in Washington D.C.)’ as the first single from the album.

Track listing

References

2021 albums
Chromeo albums